Sleeping Dogs is an action-adventure video game developed by United Front Games and published by Square Enix. It was released for PlayStation 3, Xbox 360 and Windows in 2012. Set in contemporary Hong Kong, the story follows martial artist and undercover police officer Wei Shen who infiltrates the Sun On Yee Triad organization. Gameplay focuses on Wei Shen's martial arts moves, fighting, shooting and parkour abilities, and on gadgets that can be used for combat and exploration. Players must complete missions to unlock content and continue the story, but they may instead freely roam the game's open world environment and engage in both legal and criminal activities. The latter may incite a police response, the intensity of which is controlled by a "heat" system. Actions such as fighting, driving and racing grant Shen statistical rewards and earn the player achievements.

Sleeping Dogs difficult and prolonged development began in 2008. The game was announced in 2009 as part of the True Crime series but was canceled by Activision Blizzard in 2011, as a result of the project's delays and budget issues. Six months later, Square Enix purchased the publishing rights and renamed the game Sleeping Dogs, without the True Crime license, but considered a spiritual successor. During development, United Front staff visited Hong Kong to conduct field research for the visual environments and sound. Square Enix London Studios worked with United Front for the development.

Upon its release in 2012, the game received positive reviews for its combat, voice acting, protagonist, experience system and depiction of the city; but its camera and some animations were criticized. Within one year, the game had sold over 1.5 million copies. New outfits, missions and add-ons, as well as three expansion packs, were released as downloadable content in the six months following the game's debut. A remastered version, subtitled Definitive Edition, was released in October 2014 for Microsoft Windows, PlayStation 4 and Xbox One. It features improved gameplay, setting and audio-visual quality based on community feedback. The macOS version of Definitive Edition was released on March 31, 2016, by Feral Interactive. The game spawned a spin-off multiplayer game titled Triad Wars, which was canceled in 2015. In 2017, a live action film adaptation was announced, with Donnie Yen set to star as Shen.

Gameplay 
Sleeping Dogs is an action-adventure game set in an open world environment and played from a third-person perspective. The player controls Wei Shen, a Chinese-American police officer who goes undercover and ventures out on a raid to infiltrate the Sun On Yee Triad organization. The initial missions of the game are a linear tutorial for controlling the character. After these missions, the player is allowed to explore the game's world and take part in side missions and other activities. Shen navigates the world by running, jumping, climbing over obstacles, swimming, and driving cars, boats and motorcycles. The heads-up display (HUD) interface features a mini-map that indicates targets, key locations (safe houses and contact points) and Shen's current position. The mini-map incorporates two meters: one shows Shen's health and the other his face. When the face meter fills, upgrades are unlocked such as health regeneration, improved combat abilities and reduced equipment costs. The HUD also displays the weapon carried and its ammunition count.

The game features role-playing elements based on three types of experience points (XP): Triad, Face and Police XPs. Triad XP is obtained through melee combat and violent actions such as "environmental kills". Triad XP awarded is directly proportional to the complexity of attacking moves. Face XP, obtained in civilian side missions, fills Shen's face meter and unlocks cosmetic items such as clothes and vehicles. By reaching a higher Face level, the player can freely buy vehicles or clothing. When it is full, Shen gains health regeneration, increased attack damage and other benefits. Police XP is gained by minimizing civilian casualties and property damage in missions and by completing police side missions. Gaining XP unlocks abilities such as hot-wiring cars and disarming opponents. The clothes, accessories and vehicles purchased by Shen affect non-player characters' reactions toward him. The player may collect jade statues used to unlock melee combat skills.

Sleeping Dogs melee combat has been compared to that of Batman: Arkham Asylum: it allows the player to fight opponents coming from any direction with attack, grapple and counter-moves and can be performed with or without weapons. These three basic commands are chained together with the character's movement to execute attacks. The player's face meter fills up faster when enemies are defeated with different moves in rapid succession or with environmental attacks. Environmental attacks are performed by dragging enemies to certain objects, which Shen uses to eliminate opponents. Melee weapons such as knives and tyre irons are available, but they break with extended use. The player can perform "action hijacks" while driving vehicles. These cause Shen to leap from his vehicle to steal another in motion. In combat, Shen loses health as he takes damage. This can be mitigated by taking cover where available. If the health bar is depleted, the character will respawn at a hospital. Health can also be restored by ordering food or drinks from various stalls and vending machines, which also provides a variety of buffs to Shen, such as health regeneration or improved damage.

If the player directs Shen to commit crimes, police response is indicated by a "heat" meter on the HUD. The meter displays the current wanted level; if it reaches 5, the police will aggressively pursue Shen. The meter recedes when Shen is hidden from the cops' line of sight. Police officers continue to search for Shen even if he leaves the wanted vicinity, and they will resume the chase if he is sighted. If Shen is arrested or killed by officers during missions, the player can restart from the last checkpoint.

Some areas in the world remain inaccessible until milestones in the story are achieved. Although the player must complete missions to unlock content and continue the story, they may wander the game's open world and participate in activities such as visiting a karaoke bar, carjacking, street racing and joining a fight club. There are several potential girlfriends for Shen: successfully dating them awards collectibles and bonus content. The completion of side missions rewards the player with new missions, vehicles, and outfits, among other things.

The game has no multiplayer component, but online leaderboards are available for players to compare scores. Many activities that are not central to the story grant Stat Awards in three tiers: bronze, silver and gold. These unlock achievements and trophies.

As the game progresses, the player acquires various safe houses to save progress in, but at certain times is required to go there to progress further. Like other houses, the player can survey unlocked areas, change outfits, and a parking garage is accessible in which they can use unlocked vehicles.

Synopsis

Setting and characters 
Sleeping Dogs is set in a contemporary Hong Kong, which is split into four districts named after regions of the city. The game reveals the story of Wei Shen (Will Yun Lee), a former San Francisco police officer who was transferred to the Hong Kong Police Force and assigned the task to infiltrate and destroy a Triad organization known as the Sun On Yee (based on the Sun Yee On). The main storyline features two sub-plots: Shen's balance between completing his police mission whilst committing crimes to prove himself to the Triads, and missions assigned by a Triad lieutenant, including the assassinations of Triad members loyal to other lieutenants.

Shen's mission is coordinated by Police Superintendent Thomas Pendrew (Tom Wilkinson), and progress made by Shen is reported to his handler, Raymond Mak (Byron Mann). Shen infiltrates the Sun On Yee via his childhood friend Jackie Ma (Edison Chen), a low-level Triad member; and his loyalty is tested by the Triad boss Winston Chu (Parry Shen). Other characters in the game include the head of the Sun On Yee, David Wai-Lin "Uncle" Po (James Hong); fellow Triad bosses "Broken Nose" Jiang (Elizabeth Sung) and Henry "Big Smile" Lee (Tzi Ma); Shen's love interest Amanda Cartwright (Emma Stone); Winston's right-hand man, Conroy Wu (Robin Shou); singer Vivienne Lu (Lucy Liu); and Shen's girlfriend Not Ping (Celina Jade).

Plot 
Petty criminal Wei Shen is arrested in Aberdeen, Hong Kong after a drug deal goes wrong. In jail, Shen meets an old friend, Jackie Ma, who offers to introduce Shen to the members of a gang once they are released. It is revealed that Shen is an undercover cop whose arrest was part of a police operation, headed by Superintendent Thomas Pendrew and Inspector Raymond Mak, to infiltrate the Water Street branch of a Triad organization, the "Sun On Yee". Shen joins the gang and is sent on various jobs and assignments by their leader, Winston Chu, against a rival Triad branch known as the Jade Gang led by Sam "Dogeyes" Lin.

Shen is assigned to arrest Popstar, a drug supplier for the Triad. After Popstar's arrest, the Water Street branch suspect that Shen is a cop, though he manages to make Winston relent. To prove he is not a cop, the Water Street boys send Shen to kill Siu Wah, one of Dogeyes' drug dealers, but Shen instead brings him in alive. Gaining Winston's trust, he lets Shen take over his position if something happens to him. Retaliatory attacks on each other's properties culminate in the killing of Winston and his fiancée at their wedding by men posing as members of the rival 18K Triad. The leader of the Sun On Yee, David Wa-Lin "Uncle" Po, is critically wounded in the attack but is saved by Shen.

As a reward, Shen is promoted to "Red Pole" of the Sun On Yee, and he takes over Winston's position in the Water Street branch. He hunts down Winston's killer who reveals that Dogeyes was the instigator of the attack. Shen captures Dogeyes who is killed by Winston's mother. Po dies in the hospital.

As a branch leader, Shen becomes embroiled in a power struggle over the leadership of Sun On Yee, siding with "Broken Nose" Jiang against another branch leader, Henry "Big Smile" Lee. After Po's funeral, during which they are attacked by 18K members, Lee reluctantly agrees to an election that will decide the leader of the Sun On Yee, but promises retaliation if he does not win. Shen refuses Pendrew's order to get off the case out of fear of Lee taking over. Lee orders attacks against other Sun On Yee branches in an attempt to eliminate the competition and intimidate them into voting for him, including kidnapping Jackie and handing him to the 18K as a way to get rid of Shen.

Just before the election, Shen receives a text message from Jackie to meet him, but he finds Jackie hanged and disemboweled on a pipe in an alleyway. He is knocked out and wakes up, greeted by Liu Shen Tong, a feared Triad enforcer who knows Shen is a cop.

Shen is tortured, but manages to escape and proceeds to assault Lee's compound, reaching Lee, who reveals to Shen that Pendrew sold him out. The two fight and Shen kills Lee, ending the long and violent civil war and allowing Jiang to become the chairwoman of the Sun On Yee.

With the deaths of many senior ranking gang members, Shen is commended on his work but is informed by Mak that Pendrew has been promoted to Interpol and is out of his reach. Shen receives video evidence from Jiang that Pendrew killed Uncle Po by injecting lethal chemicals in his IV. After leaking the footage, Shen is able to incriminate Pendrew and returns to work on the police force. Jiang watches Shen from afar and orders the remaining Sun On Yee members to leave him alone, due to his loyalty to her.

Development 

Towards the end of 2007, Activision approached the newly founded United Front Games, which consisted of ten people, to develop an open world game. United Front accepted and Activision provided sufficient funding for 180 employees. Early designs for the game, named Black Lotus at the time, incorporated dark tones with elements of humour similar to an "HBO crime drama". The project advanced to full production in early 2008.

A year into development, Activision proposed that Black Lotus be made part of an existing franchise and highlighted similarities to the True Crime series; both games were set in open worlds with plots centred on an undercover cop in a criminal organization. Sales of previous True Crime games had been disappointing, but Activision felt the innovations in Black Lotus could revitalize the franchise and make the game successful in its own right. Activision attached the game to the series and revealed it to the public as True Crime: Hong Kong in November 2009. They delayed the game until 2010 to allow further refinement.

Despite progress in game development, at the release of the financial report for the last quarter of 2010 on February 9, 2011, Activision announced the cancelation of True Crime: Hong Kong. The publisher said that due to "quality issues" further investment would not make the game competitive in the genre even with their most optimistic projections. Although United Front Games shared this sentiment, executive producer Stephen Van Der Mescht expressed in an interview that "True Crime: Hong Kong was playable from start to finish and virtually complete in terms of content" prior to Activision's cancellation of the project. Van Der Mescht said the game "stood apart" from the competition.

On June 22, 2011, Activision CEO Eric Hirshberg explained that the budget and development delays were contributing factors in its cancellation. According to Hirshberg, the increase in budget and subsequent delays meant that the game would have to be "pretty incredible success" for Activision to have an acceptable return on investment. Due to competition posed by other titles, particularly Grand Theft Auto and Red Dead Redemption, Activision's view was that True Crime: Hong Kong was not at the level of quality that it could compete.

United Front Games cut 120 staff with the company's solvency in doubt until August when Square Enix acquired the publishing rights to the game. Square Enix did not buy the True Crime intellectual property, and renamed the game Sleeping Dogs. Square Enix London Studios general manager Lee Singleton said he recognized the game's playability and potential. United Front Games' President Stefan Wessels stated he was excited to work with Square Enix London Studios. Sixty people were added to the development team and the game was released on August 14, 2012.

Design 
During development of the game the combat system was one of the key focuses. Mike Skupa, the design director, said that the combat was refined using feedback from Square Enix, with references drawn from Tony Jaa's The Protector. The system was designed to emphasize multi-directional combat, strike-based gameplay and environmental interaction. It started as "one big violent sandbox" and progressed to a playable demo. Skupa was pleased with how well the game kept the qualities of the original demo.

The game's designers performed extensive research in Hong Kong to create an accurate portrayal of the city. Art designers spent seven days in Hong Kong, where they studied the city's environment, and took more than 20,000 photos as references for the physical environment in the game. They traveled on foot to various locales, such as clubs and malls, and interviewed ex-Triad members and retired members of the Hong Kong Police Force Anti-Triad unit, which inspired narratives and character design. The sound designers spent ten days in the city overseeing the dialogue sessions on weekdays and capturing ambient noises around the city at weekends.

During the early stages of development, in-game dialogue was recorded in Los Angeles by local Asian actors, but much of the audio was re-recorded in Hong Kong through Drum Music, a specialist recording company. Audio design was complicated; scripting was handled in Vancouver and the recording was in Hong Kong. There were reservations among the developers about the language for the background dialogue; the sound design team eventually prevailed in using Hong Kong Cantonese over English.

In-game radio music was handled by Joe Best and sourced from various music labels. Tracks were licensed from Tsunami Music, Warp, Ninja Tune, and Roadrunner Records which lent their names to the in-game radio stations. Through Tsunami Music, voice actors were auditioned and recruited to provide presenters for each of the radio stations in the game. DJs from companies such as Kerrang! also provided voices for the in-game radio presenters. Nathan Wang composed original Chinese songs in the style of Cantopop and Mandopop songs.

Marketing and release 

United Front Games relied on viral marketing, such as Internet advertisements and TV trailers, prior to Sleeping Dogs release. The production team promoted the game with regular communication on social networking websites. They promoted it at video game conventions such as Game Developers Conference, PAX East, MCM London Comic Con, E3, Comic Con, and Gamescom.

Square Enix revealed North American pre-order bonuses for Best Buy, GameStop and Amazon customers in April 2012; each retailer offered its own exclusive in-game content pack. A United Kingdom limited edition release contained two such packs, and an Australian special edition, sold through EB Games and JB Hi-Fi, included all three packs at no added cost.

Further marketing of Sleeping Dogs was via cross-promotion on different platforms; players who bought the game through Steam received an eight item pack for Team Fortress 2, which was later made available for separate purchase, and a Hong Kong-themed Team Fortress 2 level, Kong King. Owners of Just Cause 2 on Xbox 360, PlayStation 3, or PC received automatic access to a Sleeping Dogs character outfit in the style of Just Cause 2 protagonist Rico Rodriguez. The outfit increases the player's action hijack statistics and increases the range from which the player can perform stunt takeovers of enemy vehicles.

The game was released on August 14, 2012, in North America, August 16 in Australia, and August 17 in Europe. The September 27 Japanese release was titled  and was censored to pass the classification by the Japanese ratings board CERO. Differences include penalties for attacking civilians, lack of a street race flagger and a less explicit sex scene.

An enhanced version, subtitled Definitive Edition, was released on October 10, 2014, for Microsoft Windows, PlayStation 4 and Xbox One. It includes all the 24 previously released downloadable content (DLC) and features improved graphical resolution and gameplay, setting and audiovisual quality changes based on community feedback.

Downloadable content 
 Square Enix announced six months of downloadable content to follow the game's release. Packs included content such as outfit items, vehicles, experience point boosts, tasks including money hidden around the city for players to find, vehicle races, weapons, missions and fight movesets. Square Enix released a total of five content packs along with various pre-order bonuses, such as the Dragon Master Pack which was released in November 2012. The last downloadable content for Sleeping Dogs was the "Wheels of Fury" supercar expansion, released in February 2013.

The first story-driven game expansion, Nightmare in North Point, was released in October 2012. Its theme is based on Chinese horror and folklore, and features Chinese vampires known as the jiangshi. In the expansion's plot, Shen's girlfriend is abducted by the ghost of Smiley Cat, a former gangster killed by Uncle Po, who has risen up from the underworld as a ghost to take his vengeance on the Sun On Yee. Shen fights Smiley Cat's army of jiangshi, Yaoguai and possessed gangsters, as well as the ghosts of Dogeyes, Johnny Ratface and Ponytail, who reveals that Wei can defeat Smiley Cat by burning the last remnant of his original body. After incinerating his little finger, Cat returns to the underworld and Shen's girlfriend is freed. As Shen and his girlfriend walk away in relief, the latter turns her head to the camera and smiles as her eyes glow in a freeze frame shot.

The second story-based expansion, Zodiac Tournament, was released in December 2012. The expansion adds an island to the game, with fight arenas, enemies, bosses and outfits. Inspector Teng asks Shen to investigate an illegal fighting tournament held away from Hong Kong. After defeating several fighters in lethal matches, Shen wins and pursues the Tournament Master, who offers to share his earnings in return for his life. Shen declines his offer and snaps the master's neck, killing him.

The third and final story-based expansion, Year of the Snake, was released in March 2013. It adds six missions set after the game's story. The additional missions feature Shen investigating terror attacks around Hong Kong stemming from a cultist group who believe that they will achieve spiritual salvation through the cleansing of Hong Kong residents. Shen must sabotage the cult's activities, ultimately ending in the arrest of the cult master. The DLC adds the ability for Shen to tase and arrest civilians and criminals around Hong Kong, as well as additional collectibles, side missions, ownable police vehicles, and new clothing.

Reception

Critical reception 

Sleeping Dogs received "generally favorable" reviews from critics, according to review aggregator Metacritic. It was nominated for "Action Game of the Year" and "Outstanding Achievement in Story" at the 2013 D.I.C.E. Interactive Achievement Awards.

Eurogamer writer Dan Whitehead called the combat system "robust and intuitive". IGN's Colin Moriarty compared the combat to that of Batman: Arkham City and compared it favorably with Grand Theft Auto IV despite its simplicity and repetitiveness. Hollander Cooper from GamesRadar praised the combat, especially the unique melee attacks. Andy Kelly of Computer and Video Games welcomed the slower-paced missions. Carolyn Petit from GameSpot and Ben Wilson from PlayStation Official Magazine found the combat enjoyable and highlighted the environmental attacks as "empowering and effective".  Cooper, Allistair Pinsof from Destructoid, and Edge found the missions generic and linear, a sentiment reserved by Dan Ryckert of Game Informer for the shooting missions. Petit disagreed, saying that the missions were varied and enjoyable. Whitehead and Ryckert complained that there is too little to spend mission earnings on.

The leveling system was described by Ryckert as "stand[ing] out from the open-world pack". Moriarty praised the system for its use of the Face system and the ability to replay missions if unsatisfied. Petit agreed and enjoyed the "pleasant sense of growth" given to Shen by the experience system during the campaign. Pinsof called the system "one of the greatest innovations Sleeping Dogs brings to the genre". Jon Blyth of Official Xbox Magazine liked the "pleasingly absurd" missions needed to gain Face.

Moriarty lauded the game's depiction of Hong Kong as "alive and well-populated" and liked the AI, the setting, and the voice acting, in particular the use of Cantonese and English. Edge gave similar praise: "Offering a view of Asia through the filter of its action film industry, this is a depiction of Hong Kong that could have come straight from the reel." Pinsof acclaimed the city's scale and AI.

Shen and the other characters were mostly well received. Cooper applauded the conflicted nature of Shen's personality as a result of being in an overwhelming situation, arguing that this detail solidified him as a developed and likable protagonist. Cooper found the Triad members unsatisfactory by comparison, comparing them unfavorably with Grand Theft Auto characters. Edge called Shen an engaging protagonist and complimented the other characters, whose voice actors brought life to the characters. Blyth described the cast, aside from Shen, as "brilliantly recognizable stereotypes that have been given enough extra edge for you to care about them", and felt the attitude shifts of some characters were distracting and unrealistic. Wilson said that the characters were "fleshed out brilliantly". Pinsof claimed that the game's premise "grants a perfect excuse for Shen to do terrible things while remaining a sympathetic, level-headed lead." Kelly thought Shen's two-faced nature was the main entertainment factor of the missions. Whitehead found the player's ability to switch allegiances as needed to wear away at "the already fragile grasp the narrative has on Shen's conflicted loyalties."

Moriarty criticized the game's draw distance and texture loading and Whitehead noted some framerate and environmental glitches. Petit said that, in spite of generally convincing non-player character design, "character models look like plastic dolls when viewed up close, and some gestures characters make are rigid and unnatural." Edge stated that character animations in a variety of contexts look "robotic", and Kelly said that "everything in the distance looks like it's been smeared in Vaseline." Pinsof described the graphics as "gorgeous" and conducive to an immersive experience in Hong Kong. Moriarty noted that the game's camera was particularly problematic when driving and less so during combat. Cooper and Edge also criticized the camera.

Sales 
In the UK, Sleeping Dogs was the best-selling game in the week of its release, and had the fifth-highest first-week sales of any game released in 2012. It retained the top spot during its second week, despite sales dropping by 15%. It returned to the top spot after four weeks on sale. Sleeping Dogs sales rose by 8%, despite five weeks in the chart, defeating new release Tekken Tag Tournament 2. Sleeping Dogs was the 20th-best-selling title of 2012 in the UK and the best-selling original game. According to NPD Group, Sleeping Dogs was the sixth-best-selling game in the US in August 2012 at 172,000 copies. PC sales for Sleeping Dogs were not counted, as it is only available by download in the US.

According to Square Enix, Sleeping Dogs had sold 1.5 million copies by the end of September 2012. Square Enix president Yoichi Wada defended the game's sales and said that the firm might have had unreasonably high expectations for the game. He saw Sleeping Dogs as a strong new intellectual property and said that titles such as Sleeping Dogs tend to sell better over long periods of time in the West, unlike in Japan where most lifetime sales are achieved in the first months. On March 26, 2013, Square Enix announced that the game was expected to sell about 1.75 million copies in 2013. On September 10, 2013, the company announced that Sleeping Dogs, alongside Tomb Raider and Hitman: Absolution, had been successful in their game development, but did not meet sales expectations, and were considered by the publisher "failures".

In other media

Canceled sequel 
In early 2013, United Front was working on a sequel to Sleeping Dogs. The game would have picked up after the original game, once again following the exploits of Wei Shen. He would be joined by a "conflicted, corrupt partner" named Henry Fang, as they explored China's Pearl River Delta. The player would have the ability to arrest any NPC in the world, and influence a branching storyline that swapped between both Shen and Fang. The game was said to be United Front's most ambitious game, which would have included a second screen app for mobile devices that would be able to interact with the world of the game; playing as inspector Jane Teng, the player would "manage the police force and try to control territories" from a mobile device, with the choices made in the game affecting gameplay in Sleeping Dogs 2. The mobile game could be played on its own, with the hope being the free-to-play game would point players towards the console game. Plans for the sequel were eventually scrapped in late 2013 before the project went into production.

Canceled spin-off 

Triad Wars is a canceled spin-off to Sleeping Dogs, which was scheduled to be released in 2015. The game was initially planned to be released as a PC online game with more massively multiplayer online (MMO) elements, with the central goal being to "rise to power as a criminal kingpin of the Triad underworld". It featured the same map as the original Sleeping Dogs.

In October 2013, United Front Games confirmed that a game, titled Triad Wars, set within Sleeping Dogs universe was in production. The developer confirmed that it would be published by Square Enix, and would be shown to the public in 2014. Triad Wars was described by the developers as "something we've wanted to do for ages but just never had the chance. But now we do." United Front Games teased that Triad Wars would be a PC online game on September 19, 2014. An announcement trailer premiered on September 22, 2014. In early 2015, the game entered its beta-testing stage. It was announced in December 2015 that the game would be shutting down. Developer United Front Games announced the closure on Twitter and the Triad Wars forums. The developers published a statement saying "We've loved seeing how you've played Triad Wars but we know it wasn't right for many of you."

Film adaptation
In March 2017, a live action film adaptation of the game was announced. It is being produced by Neal Moritz, with Donnie Yen starring as Wei Shen. A release date for the film has yet to be announced. In February 2018 Yen stated on various social media accounts that the film was in production.

See also 
 List of Square Enix video game franchises

References

External links 
 

2012 video games
3D beat 'em ups
Bandai Namco games
Detective video games
Open-world video games
Organized crime video games
MacOS games
PlayStation 3 games
PlayStation 4 games
Single-player video games
Square Enix games
Third-person shooters
Triad (organized crime)
Video games about police officers
Video games developed in Canada
Video games developed in the United Kingdom
Video games scored by Jeff Tymoschuk
Video games set in Hong Kong
Video games with downloadable content
Windows games
Xbox 360 games
Xbox One games
Video games using Havok
Feral Interactive games